Long Sutton railway station was a station in Long Sutton, Lincolnshire, England. It was part of the Midland and Great Northern Joint Railway which closed in 1959.

References 

Disused railway stations in Lincolnshire
Former Midland and Great Northern Joint Railway stations
Railway stations in Great Britain opened in 1862
Railway stations in Great Britain closed in 1959
1862 establishments in England
1959 disestablishments in England
Long Sutton, Lincolnshire